Scopula concinnaria is a moth of the family Geometridae. It was described by Philogène Auguste Joseph Duponchel in 1842. It is endemic to Spain.

Subspecies
Scopula concinnaria concinnaria
Scopula concinnaria universaria (Zerny 1927) (Spain: Aragon)

References

Moths described in 1842
concinnaria
Endemic fauna of Spain
Moths of Europe
Taxa named by Philogène Auguste Joseph Duponchel